Het Zinneke (Brusselian dialect for "the mutt"), sometimes called Zinneke Pis by analogy with Manneken Pis, is a bronze sculpture in central Brussels, Belgium, erected in 1998. Created by Tom Frantzen, it represents a urinating dog, along the same lines as Manneken Pis (a boy) and its derivative Jeanneke Pis (a girl). It is an example of folk humour (zwanze) popular in Brussels.

Het Zinneke is located at the junction of the / and the / in the City of Brussels, not far from the /, a former covered market, and one of the trendiest districts of the capital.

History
Zinneke is a nickname chosen to represent people from Brussels. The word means "mutt" or "bastard" in Brusselian dialect, and originally referred to the city's stray dogs that hung around the streets by the Lesser Senne (a tangent canal of the river Senne, which circumnavigated Brussels along the city walls) until the end of the 19th century.

The sculpture was created in 1998 by the artist Tom Frantzen, also known for other public statues in Brussels, such as the Vaartkapoen (1985) on the / in Molenbeek-Saint-Jean, Madame Chapeau (2000) on the /, and L'Envol (2017) on the /. It is a nod to the landmark sculpture Manneken Pis, in place since 1619, and its female counterpart Jeanneke Pis, installed in 1987. It is, however, not associated with a fountain. 

On 1 August 2015, Het Zinneke was struck by a car, and its two legs were broken. During its restoration by the sculptor, an explanatory note was attached on site. On 24 September 2015, the sculpture was reinstalled in its original place.

See also 
 List of depictions of urine in art
 Zinneke Parade

References

Notes

External link

Buildings and structures in Brussels
Tourist attractions in Brussels
Statues in Belgium
City of Brussels
Sculptures of dogs
1998 sculptures
1998 establishments in Belgium